Bartolomeo Colleoni (1400 – 2 November 1475) was an Italian condottiero, who became captain-general of the Republic of Venice. Colleoni "gained reputation as the foremost tactician and disciplinarian of the 15th century". He is also credited with having refurbished the Roman baths at Trescore Balneario.

Biography

Background

Colleoni was born in Solza near Bergamo, which was then part of the Duchy of Milan. In Bergamo Colleoni later bult himself a mortuary chapel, the Cappella Colleoni. The Colleoni family was noble, but had been exiled with the rest of the Guelphs by the Visconti of Milan. Bartolomeo's father Paolo Colleoni had seized the castle of Trezzo, until he was assassinated by his cousins, probably acting on the orders of Filippo Maria Visconti, Duke of Milan.

Career
The young Colleoni trained as a soldier, first in the retinue of Filippo d'Arcello, the new master of Piacenza. Then he entered the service of various condottieri, beginning with Braccio da Montone, who was skirmishing in Apulia, profiting from the struggles between Alfonso of Aragon and Louis of Anjou during the weak sovereignty of Queen Joan II and taking Alfonso's cause, then that of Carmagnola. After the latter was put to death in Venice (1432), Colleoni entered the direct service of the Venetian Republic, which represented the major phase of his career.

Although Gianfrancesco I Gonzaga, Marquess of Mantua was nominally commander-in-chief, Colleoni was in fact the real leader of the army. He recaptured many towns and districts for Venice from the Milanese, and when Gonzaga went over to the enemy, Colleoni continued to serve the Venetians under Erasmo of Narni (known as Gattamelata) and Francesco I Sforza, winning battles at Brescia, Verona, and on the Lake of Garda.

When peace was made between Milan and Venice in 1441, Colleoni joined the Milanese, together with Sforza, in 1443. Although well treated at first, Colleoni soon fell under the Visconti's suspicion, and was imprisoned at Monza, where he remained until the duke's death in 1447. The Milanese then proclaimed the Golden Ambrosian Republic with Sforza as commander-in-chief, whom Colleoni served for a time, but in 1448 he took leave of Sforza and returned to the Venetians until 1451. Disgusted at not having been elected captain-general, he once more went over to Sforza (who had conquered Milan in 1450, ending the Ambrosian Republic and being recognised as the new Milanese duke) in 1452, but Venice could not do without him; by offering him greater emoluments, the Venetians induced him to return in 1453, and in 1455 he was appointed captain-general of the Republic of Venice for life. Although he occasionally fought on his own account when Venice was at peace, he remained at the disposal of the republic in time of war until his death.

Retirement

He set his residence in the castle of Malpaga, which he had bought in 1465 and restored in the years following.
Although he often changed sides, no act of treachery is imputed to him, nor did he subject the territories he passed through to the rapine and robbery practised by other soldiers of fortune. When not fighting, he devoted his time to introducing agricultural improvements on the vast estates which the Venetians had granted him, and to charitable works. At his death in 1475, at Malpaga, he left a large sum to the republic for the Turkish war, with a request that an equestrian statue of himself should be erected in the Piazza San Marco. The statue was modelled by Andrea del Verrocchio and cast in bronze after his death by Alessandro Leopardi, but, as no monument was permitted in the piazza, it was placed near the Scuola Grande of St Mark outside the Church of SS Giovanni e Paolo.

Italian cruiser Bartolomeo Colleoni
In 1930 the Italian Regia Marina launched a cruiser of the Condottieri class named after Bartolomeo Colleoni.

References

Footnotes

External links 

Page at the Italian history chronology website 

1475 deaths
People from the Province of Bergamo
15th-century condottieri
1400 births
Republic of Venice generals